The Last Confession is a  2006 Russian four-part TV Series directed by Sergei Lyalin. Dedicated to the activities of the legendary underground anti-fascist Komsomol organization Young Guard, which operated during the Great Patriotic War in the occupied   of Krasnodon in  Ukrainian SSR.

Cast 
Ivan Vikulov as Oleg Koshevoy
Anastasia Panina as Lyubov Shevtsova
Eldar Lebedev sa Sergei Tyulenin
Valeria Kalennikova as Ulyana Gromova
Timur Oragvelidze as Zhora Harutyunyants
Lyudmila Kolesnikova as Valya Borts
Eva Aveeva as Nina Ivantsova
Yekaterina Vinogradova as Olya Ivantsova
 Vladimir Korenev as general of the Wehrmacht
 Yuriy Nazarov as Chizhov
 Svetlana Ivanova as Nadezhda Tyulenina
 Valentina Ananina as old woman Marusya
 Anatoliy Kotenyov as Rykin

References

External links 
 The Last Confession on KinoPoisk
 На экране – история Отечества. Исторические фильмы России и СССР 1908–2019

Russian television miniseries
2000s Russian television series
2006 Russian television series debuts
2006 Russian television series endings
Russian telenovelas
Channel One Russia original programming
Russian-language television shows
Russian war drama films
Films based on Russian novels
Russian World War II films